Hämeenlinna (or Croneburgum) is a city and municipality of about  inhabitants in the heart of the historical province of Tavastia and the modern province of Kanta-Häme in the south of Finland. Hämeenlinna is the oldest inland city of Finland and was one of the most important Finnish cities until the 19th century. It remains an important regional center. The medieval Häme Castle (also Tavastia Castle) is located in the city.

Hämeenlinna is known as the birthplace of Finnish national composer Jean Sibelius. Today, it belongs to the region of Tavastia Proper (Kanta-Häme), and before 2010 it was the residence city for the Governor of the province of Southern Finland. Nearby cities include the capital Helsinki, Tampere and Lahti, the regional center of Päijänne Tavastia (Päijät-Häme).

The neighboring municipalities of Hämeenlinna are Akaa, Asikkala, Hattula, Hausjärvi, Hollola, Janakkala, Loppi, Padasjoki, Pälkäne, Tammela, Urjala and Valkeakoski. The former municipalities, Hauho, Kalvola, Lammi, Renko and Tuulos, were consolidated with Hämeenlinna on 1 January 2009; with these municipal associations, the Hattula municipality is almost completely surrounded by Hämeenlinna.

The coat of arms of Hämeenlinna is based on the 17th-century town seal, which in turn refers to the Häme Castle built by the Lake Vanajavesi in the Middle Ages, near which the city was founded. The current coat of arms was designed by Gustaf von Numers on the basis of the old coat of arms, and was confirmed on September 21, 1956.

Geography

There are a total of 339 lakes in whole or in part in the area of the city of Hämeenlinna. The largest of them are Lake Vanajavesi, Lake Kukkia and Lake Kuohijärvi. The main features of the Hämeenlinna landscape are the Häme Lake Plateau, the Vanajavesi Valley and the Kanta-Häme Grove Center. In many places, the landscapes are marked by the prosperous Tavastian agricultural culture.

Climate

Cityscape
The center of Hämeenlinna is located on the Saarinen Hill on the shores of Lake Vanajavesi, and is bordered on the west by Highway 3 (E12), while Highway 10 bypasses the city to the south and east. The street network in the center is based on a grid pattern drawn up by C. L. Engel in 1832 with the Market Square as its center. On the edge of the market square are the town hall, Hämeenlinna Church and the Häme County Government House. The city center is divided into four districts, which are Linnanniemi, Koilliskulma, Hämeensaari and Saaristenmäki. Raatihuoneenkatu, which has been partially transformed into a pedestrian street, is the most significant shopping street in the city center; for example, at the western end of the street, the Goodman Shopping Center was completed in October 2014.

There are plenty of buildings of different styles in the city center, and in proportion to the city’s population, it is quite large and densely built. The most significant expansion direction in the city center in the 2010s has been the Keinusaari district on the other side of Lake Vanajavesi, where, for example, the city's railway station is located. Supplementary construction has also been carried out in the city center on an ongoing basis. The center of Hämeenlinna has been ridiculed as the "Finland's largest lit cemetery".

History

Vanaja is the name of a settlement next to Vanajavesi that had been in existence since the Viking Age. The castle was built in the late 13th century to secure Swedish power in central Finland. A village was established near Häme Castle to provide services and goods to its inhabitants.

The village was granted city rights on January 19, 1639, but Hämeenlinna, which still after that looked more like a rural village, developed very slowly, which was a typical problem for inland cities in Finland compared to the most prosperous coastal cities. In 1777, King Gustav III of Sweden moved it one kilometre south to the hill on which it still stands.

The city is known for its schools and academies where many famous Finns have studied. Schools, government and the military have characterised the life of Hämeenlinna throughout history. The current Hämeenlinna railway station ( in Finnish) was built in 1921.

Demographics

Economy

The economic structure of Hämeenlinna is close to the national average. In 2015, there were 28,270 jobs in the city. Of these, 75% were in the service sector, 3% in primary production (agriculture, forestry and fisheries) and 21% in processing. The share of the unemployed was 13,6%.

Largest employers (by number of employees) 

City of Hämeenlinna: 2,490
State of Finland: 2,480
Kanta-Häme Hospital District: 1,460
Ruukki (Rautaruukki Oyj): 1,030
Huhtamäki Oyj: 700
HAMK University of Applied Sciences (an institution offering tertiary degree education): 510
Kansanterveystyön ky: 490
Patria Vehicles Oy: 430
Konecranes Standard Lifting Oy: 330
Koulutuskeskus Tavastia: 270
Aina Group Oyj: 250
Lindström Oy: 175

Education

Hämeenlinna is home to HAMK Häme University of Applied Sciences' headquarters. Founded in 1873, Hämeenlinna Lyceum has many cultural influencers. The school is one of the most famous educational institutions in Finland, as many well-known Finns have graduated from the institution; examples include master composer Jean Sibelius and president J. K. Paasikivi. Hämeenlinna Lyceum has a middle school (grades 7–9) and a high school. Another of the high schools in Hämeenlinna's inner city is Kauriala High School. Hämeenlinna's Lyceum and Kauriala High School were to be combined in the fall of 2018 to form a large high school with more than a thousand students on the Hattelmala campus of the Tavastia Education Consortium. However, the city council decided to cancel the high school project in the spring of 2018, and the high schools will continue to be separate.

Culture

Food
In the 1980s, the following dishes were named Hämeenlinna's traditional cuisine: as a daily meal, smoked ham and sourdough; as a festive meal, the herring wrapped in rye dough, i.e. "fish bread", buttermilk and beer, and the riistansylttääjän lintupaisti, which means pheasant stuffed almonds with potato and apple slices.

Sport

Elite level ice hockey teams HPK of the Liiga and HPK Kiekkonaiset of the Naisten Liiga
Football teams FC Hämeenlinna and the men's representative team of Hämeenlinnan Härmä, which play in the third-tier Kakkonen, and the women's representative team of Hämeenlinnan Härmä of the second-tier Naisten Ykkönen
The city hosted the modern pentathlon competition for the 1952 Summer Olympics in Helsinki.
Hämeenlinna hosted the first round of the Underwater Rugby Euroleague in October 2012 and again in 2015.
The Ahvenisto Race Circuit, opened in 1967, hosts many motorsport happenings. Track has an FIA Grade 4 license.
Steelers Sailbandy(Floorball) Club which play in the F-liiga.

Notable natives or residents

 Jouko Ahola (strongman/actor)
 Antony Hämäläinen (vocalist) 
 Eino Leino (poet) 
 Antti Miettinen (NHL player); won a bronze medal with Finland in the 2010 Vancouver Olympics
 Victorine Nordenswan (painter)
 J. K. Paasikivi (7th President of Finland)  
 Kimi Räikkönen (Formula One driver) and Jenni Dahlman (married in 2004 in Hämeenlinna) 
 Juuse Saros (NHL goaltender)
 Jean Sibelius (composer)
 Turisas (metal band)

International relations

Twin towns – Sister cities
Hämeenlinna is twinned with:

See also
 Aulanko
 Finnish national road 3
 Hämeen Sanomat
 Hämeenkoski
 Hämeenkyrö
 Parola (Hattula)
 Tavastia Castle
 Lake Vanajavesi

References

External links

1952 Summer Olympics official report (pp. 60–62)
City of Hämeenlinna – Official site
Häme Castle

 
Venues of the 1952 Summer Olympics
Olympic modern pentathlon venues
Cities and towns in Finland
Municipalities of Kanta-Häme
Grand Duchy of Finland
Populated places established in 1639
1639 establishments in Sweden